Rajpur Sonarpur is a city and a municipality of the South 24 Parganas district in the Indian state of West Bengal. It is a part of the area covered by the Kolkata Metropolitan Development Authority (KMDA). Rajpur and Sonarpur are two separate towns. Since the formation of the municipality, these twin towns are known together as Rajpur Sonarpur.

History
Many janapadas grew up along the old Bhagirathi channel from the ancient times till around the 16th century: Kalighat, Boral, Rajpur, Harinavi, Mahinagar, Baruipur, Baharu, Jaynagar, Majilpur, Chhatrabhog etc. Bipradas Pipilai's Manasavijaya, composed in 1495, mentions many places in this region. "Chand Sadagar, a merchant character of the Manasavijaya, reached Baruipur, from Kalighat, through the old Bhagirathi channel. From there he proceeded towards Chhatrabhog, and then traveling through Hatiagarh pargana reached the open sea". Chaitanyadeva (1486–1534) also went through this route. Travelling by boat to Puri he halted at the village of Atisara, near Baruipur. "His last stoppage in 24 Parganas was at Chhatrabhog, now a village within the jurisdiction of the Mathurapur police station. Chhatrabhog seems to have been an important river-port on the old Bhagirathi channel". Rama Chandra Khan, the zamindar of Chhatrabhog, helped Chaitanyadeva to continue with his journey.

The area was home to the feudatory landlords (zamindars). The name Rajpur has been thus derived from the Bengali words Rajar Puri to Rajpuri and in this form to the now Rajpur. Being on the banks of the Adi Ganga, Rajpur was one of the major locations of Bengal at that time. The proximity to Kolkata's southern district and being on the banks of Adi Ganga, which is just across the river made the place to be well connected. The old zamindar's house in Rajpur Harinavi is like the Roy Choudhury's. The family stayed in Rajpur. The ancestral houses of Sarat Chandra Bose and Subhash Chandra Bose were at Kodalia, a neighbourhood in Rajpur. Both of them were members of the first 24 Parganas District Committee of the Congress Party, which was formed in 1921.

Geography

Area overview
Baruipur subdivision is a rural subdivision with moderate levels of urbanization. 31.05% of the population lives in the urban areas and 68.95% lives in the rural areas. In the northern portion of the subdivision (shown in the map alongside) there are 10 census towns. The entire district is situated in the Ganges Delta and the northern part of the subdivision is a flat plain bordering the metropolis of Kolkata.

Note: The map alongside presents some of the notable locations in the subdivision. All places marked in the map are linked in the larger full screen map.

Location

Danga and Ramchandrapur are adjacent to Rajpur Sonarpur on its south-eastern side, as per the map of the Sonarpur CD block in the District Census Handbook 2011 for the South 24 Parganas district.

Petua, Panchghara, Mallikpur and Hariharpur form a cluster of census towns in the Baruipur CD block, as per the map of the Baruipur CD block in the District Census Handbook 2011 for the South 24 Parganas district. This cluster has Rajpur Sonarpur on the east and Bidyadharpur on the north, both in the Sonarpur CD block, as per the map of the Sonarpur CD block in the District Census Handbook 2011 for South 24 Parganas district.

Climate
Köppen-Geiger climate classification system classifies its climate as tropical wet and dry (Aw).

Demographics

According to the 2011 Census of India, Rajpur Sonarpur had a total population of 424,368, of which 215,405 were males and 208,963 were females. There were 35,274 people in the age range of 0 to 6 years. The total number of literate people was 350,721, which constituted 82.6% of the population with male literacy of 85.4% and female literacy of 79.8%. The effective literacy (7+) of population over 6 years of age was 90.1%, of which male literacy rate was 93.2% and female literacy rate was 87.0%. The Scheduled Castes and Scheduled Tribes population was 78,655 and 2,340 respectively. Rajpur Sonarpur had a total of 106,604 households as of 2011.

Kolkata Urban Agglomeration
The following municipalities and census towns in the South 24 Parganas district were part of the Kolkata Urban Agglomeration in the 2011 census: Maheshtala (M), Joka (CT), Balarampur (CT), Chata Kalikapur (CT), Budge Budge (M), Nischintapur (CT), Uttar Raypur (CT), Pujali (M) and Rajpur Sonarpur (M).

Civic administration

Municipality
It has jurisdiction over parts of the Rajpur Sonarpur. It is divided into 35 wards. According to the 2022 municipal election, it is being controlled by the All India Trinamool Congress.

Police station
It has jurisdiction over parts of the Rajpur Sonarpur Municipality, and the Sonarpur CD block.

CD block HQ
The headquarters of the Sonarpur CD block are located at Rajpur Sonarpur.

Transport
Rajpur Sonarpur is on the State Highway 1.

Sonarpur Junction railway station is on the Sealdah–Namkhana line of the Kolkata Suburban Railway system.

Commuters
With the electrification of the railways, suburban traffic has grown tremendously since the 1960s. As of 2005-06, more than 1.7 million (17 lakhs) commuters use the Kolkata Suburban Railway system daily. After the partition of India, refugees from erstwhile East Pakistan and Bangladesh had a strong impact on the development of urban areas in the periphery of Kolkata. The new immigrants depended on Kolkata for their livelihood, thus increasing the number of commuters. Eastern Railway runs 1,272 EMU trains daily.

Education
 Sonarpur Mahavidyalaya, established in 1985, is affiliated with the University of Calcutta. It offers honours courses in Bengali, English, Sanskrit, history, political science, philosophy, economics, geography, education, mathematics and accounting & finance, and general degree courses in arts, science, and commerce.
 Narendrapur Ramakrishna Mission Residential College, established in 1960, is affiliated with the University of Calcutta. It offers honours courses in Bengali, English, Sanskrit, history, political science, philosophy, economics, geography, education, mathematics and accounting & finance, and general degree courses in arts, science, and commerce.
 Future Institute of Engineering and Management, established in 2001, offers diploma, undergraduate and postgraduate degree courses in Engineering and Technology and other allied fields.
 Netaji Subhash Engineering College, established in 1998, offers diploma, undergraduate and postgraduate degree courses in Engineering and Technology and other allied fields.
 Meghnad Saha Institute of Technology, established in 2001, offers diploma, undergraduate and postgraduate degree courses in Engineering and Technology and other allied fields.
 Harinavi DVAS High School is a Bengali-medium coeducational school. It was established in 1866 and has facilities for teaching from class V to class XII.
 B.D.M International is an English-medium coeducational school. It was established in 1966 and has facilities for teaching from class I to class XII.

Healthcare
Sonarpur Rural Hospital, with 25 beds, is the major government medical facility in the Sonarpur CD block.

The Indian Institute of Liver and Digestive Sciences is a super speciality hospital that treats liver diseases. It has come up as a private initiative with government support.

References

External links
 

Cities and towns in South 24 Parganas district
Neighbourhoods in Kolkata
Kolkata Metropolitan Area